Ricardo López Tenorio   (born January 24 th, 1947 in Santa Ana) is a Salvadoran football coach.
During his playing days, Tenorio was part of the Under 20 El Salvador team that won the 1964 under 20 NORCECA title .

Championship record 
70-73 24-27 Pertica Champion

74 28 C.E.L. Champion

78-80 32 Mario Calvo 2nd

80-82 34 Leones, F.C. 3rd

83 37 ADET 2nd

84 38 DUA 3rd

86 40 11 Lobos 2nd

87 41 Acajutla 2nd

88 42 C.D. FAS 2nd

88 42 National Team Duty

89 43 C.D. FAS (issues)

90 44 C.D. Tiburones 4th

90-93 43 Soccer Academy 3rd Div.

93-94 46 National Coach Central American Games

94-95 49 C.D. Marte 2nd

Personal life
He lives in Dallas managing his own Soccer School. Jose Ricardo López Tenorio could be the next Soccer National Coach.

External links
http://wvw.nacion.com/ln_ee/1999/diciembre/15/deportes8.html
http://www.ceroacero.es/treinador.php?id=14671

1947 births
Living people
Sportspeople from Santa Ana, El Salvador
Salvadoran football managers
El Salvador national football team managers